Raymond Moore may refer to:

Raymond Moore (photographer) (1920–1987), English art photographer
Raymond Moore (tennis) (born 1946), former tennis player from South Africa
Raymond Cecil Moore (1892–1974), American geologist and paleontologist
Raymond John Moore (1914–1988), Canadian botanist
Raymond P. Moore (born 1953), United States district judge

See also
Ray Moore (disambiguation)